The 2013 Indiana 250 was the 19th stock car race of the 2013 NASCAR Nationwide Series and the second iteration of the event. The race was held on Saturday, July 27, 2013, in Speedway, Indiana, at the Indianapolis Motor Speedway, a  permanent rectangular-shaped racetrack. The race took the scheduled 100 laps to complete. At race's end, Kyle Busch, driving for Joe Gibbs Racing, would dominate the weekend to win his 59th career NASCAR Nationwide Series win and his eighth of the season. To fill out the podium, Brian Scott of Richard Childress Racing and Joey Logano of Penske Racing would finish second and third, respectively.

Background 

The Indianapolis Motor Speedway, located in Speedway, Indiana, (an enclave suburb of Indianapolis) in the United States, is the home of the Indianapolis 500 and the Brickyard 400.

Constructed in 1909, it is the original speedway, the first racing facility so named. It has a permanent seating capacity estimated at 235,000 with infield seating raising capacity to an approximate 400,000. It is the highest-capacity sports venue in the world.

Entry list 

 (R) denotes rookie driver.
 (i) denotes driver who is ineligible for series driver points.

Practice

First practice 
The first practice session was held on Friday, July 26, at 8:30 AM, and would last for one hour and 30 minutes.

Second and final practice 
The second and final practice session, sometimes referred to as Happy Hour, was held on Saturday, July 20, at 10:30 AM EST, and would last for 55 minutes.

Qualifying 
Qualifying was held on Saturday, July 27, at 12:05 PM EST. Each driver would have two laps to set a fastest time; the fastest of the two would count as their official qualifying lap.

Four drivers would fail to qualify: Matt DiBenedetto, Carl Long, Morgan Shepherd, and Joey Gase.

Full qualifying results

Race results

Standings after the race 

Drivers' Championship standings

Note: Only the first 12 positions are included for the driver standings.

References 

2013 NASCAR Nationwide Series
NASCAR races at Indianapolis Motor Speedway
July 2013 sports events in the United States
2013 in sports in Indiana